Ambassador is in charge of the Embassy of India, Algiers. Gaurav Ahluwalia is the current Ambassador of India to Algeria.

The following people have served as Ambassadors of India to Algeria.

Ambassador of India to Algeria

See also
 Embassy of India, Algiers

References 

Ambassadors of India to Algeria
India
Algeria